Vijay Hanumantrao Bhosle (born 1 October 1937) is a former Indian cricketer who played first-class cricket in India from 1956 to 1971. 

Bhosle was a middle-order batsman and occasional leg-spin bowler who came close to national selection for some years in the 1960s. He spent most of the first half of his career with Maharashtra and the second half with Bombay. He also represented West Zone from 1963-64 to 1968-69. The highest of his 17 centuries was 208 for Bombay against Rajasthan in the semi-final of the 1968–69 Ranji Trophy. His best bowling figures were 7 for 77 in the 1962-63 Moin-ud-Dowlah Gold Cup Tournament.

References

External links
 
 

1937 births
Living people
Indian cricketers
Maharashtra cricketers
Baroda cricketers
Mumbai cricketers
West Zone cricketers
Indian Universities cricketers
Associated Cement Company cricketers
Indian Starlets cricketers